Atopy (Greek ατοπία, atopía; Socrates has often been called "átopos") is a concept describing the ineffability of things or emotions that are seldom experienced, that are outstanding and that are original in the strict sense. It is a certain quality (of experience) that can be observed within oneself or within others, differing from the ideal quality that is conceptualized, not experienced.

History

Roland Barthes
French literary theorist Roland Barthes discussed and reevaluated the concept of atopy multiple times in his work. In A Lover's Discourse: Fragments, Barthes defined it as "unclassifiable, of a ceaselessly unforeseen originality", referring to the circumstance, an atopia, in which atopy is intercommunicated in interest and love. Previously, in The Pleasure of the Text, he regarded pleasure itself as atopic, saying that "the pleasure of the text is scandalous: not because it is immoral but because it is atopic."

In popular culture
Icelandic singer Björk credited Barthes' interpretation of atopy as a main inspiration for the lyrics of her 2022 song "Atopos".

References

Philosophical anthropology
Concepts in the philosophy of mind